
Gmina Wiśniowa is a rural gmina (administrative district) in Strzyżów County, Subcarpathian Voivodeship, in south-eastern Poland.

The gmina contains part of the protected area called Czarnorzeki-Strzyżów Landscape Park.

Villages
Gmina Wiśniowa contains the villages and settlements of Jaszczurowa, Jazowa, Kalembina, Kozłówek, Kożuchów, Markuszowa, Niewodna, Oparówka, Pstrągówka, Różanka, Szufnarowa, Tułkowice and Wiśniowa.

Neighbouring gminas
Gmina Wiśniowa is bordered by the gminas of Frysztak, Strzyżów, Wielopole Skrzyńskie and Wojaszówka.

References
Polish official population figures 2006

Wisniowa
Strzyżów County